Nature Red in Tooth and Claw: Theism and the Problem of Animal Suffering is a 2008 book by Michael J. Murray, which explores animal suffering throughout evolutionary history as a natural evil, within the context of the problem of evil. The title of the book references a famous and oft-quoted phrase from the poem "In Memoriam A.H.H." by Alfred, Lord Tennyson.

Reception 
The philosopher Mylan Engel Jr. describes the book as a useful text for philosophy of religion courses, particularly those on the topic of the problem of evil. He argues that the book is useful because it "illustrates just how bleak the theist's prospects are for handling this enduring challenge to the rationality of theistic belief", but raises a concern that Murray "downplays the significance of animal suffering", which could lead some readers to not take steps to reduce animal suffering that they personally contribute to. Joseph J. Lynch also argues that the "Causa Dei" defence of God's existence advocated for in the book "may unjustifiably minimize the significance of animal suffering or simply explain it away", but calls the book comprehensive overall and feels that it will provoke discussion on the topic, even if it doesn't "solve the problem of God and animal pain".

T. J. Mawson argues that the book rather than providing a theodicy, is more of a defence for theism in the light of the available evidence and suggests that overall, the book supports a verdict of "case not proven", when it comes to the problem of animal suffering.

C. R. Dodsworth praises the book, calling it "carefully argued, historically grounded and insightful". Gary Chartier's review is also positive, calling the book the "only book-length study in English of theodicy and animal suffering in the philosophy of religion", asserting that it sheds light on and analyses one of the most problematic facets of the problem of evil for theists, which has been frequently considered to be intractable and that "Murray has set the standard for the discussion of animal pain as a problem in theodicy".

C. Robert Mesle is critical of the book, arguing that its focus on "single traditional definition of God" was too narrow and that it didn't engage with theologians who have differing conceptions of God, also arguing that the book express "low standards of rationality", which "moves us away from the larger quest of great philosophers and theologians".

See also 
 Evolutionary theodicy
 Predation problem
 Wild animal suffering

References 

2008 non-fiction books
Animal ethics books
Books about evolution
Books about wild animal suffering
Oxford University Press books
Problem of evil
Theology books